Flavoprotein pyridine nucleotide cytochrome reductases catalyse the interchange of reducing equivalents between one-electron carriers and the two-electron-carrying nicotinamide dinucleotides. The enzymes include ferredoxin-NADP+ reductases, plant and fungal NAD(P)H:nitrate reductases, cytochrome b5 reductases, cytochrome P450 reductases, sulphite reductases, nitric oxide synthases, phthalate dioxygenase reductase, and various other flavoproteins.

Human proteins containing this domain 
MTRR;      NDOR1;     NOS1;      NOS2A;     NOS3;      NR1;       POR;

References

Protein families
Enzymes